Mark Welson Chua (November 30, 1981 - March 18, 2001) was a Filipino student of the University of Santo Tomas whose death is widely believed to be linked to his exposé of alleged irregularities in the Reserve Officers' Training Corps unit of the university. His death became the catalyst for the passage of Republic Act 9163 or the "National Service Training Program Law", which removed completion of mandatory ROTC as a precondition for graduation for male college students in the Philippines.

Background
Chua took his elementary and high school education at Saint Jude Catholic School and his college education at the University of Santo Tomas. As a member of the ROTC unit's intelligence monitoring team, he had first-hand knowledge of corruption within the organization, which he and another student, Romulo Yumol, divulged to UST's official student publication The Varsitarian in January 2001. This resulted in the relief of then-commandant Major Demy T Tejares and his staff.

Death
Chua received death threats after his revelations. The new ROTC commandant advised him to undergo security training at Fort Bonifacio. On 15 March 2001, he was supposed to meet with an agent but he was never seen alive again. Three days later his decomposing body, wrapped in a carpet, was found floating in the Pasig River near the Jones Bridge. His hands and feet were tied and his face wrapped in cloth and packing tape. The autopsy report showed that sludge was in his lungs, indicating that he was alive when he was thrown into the river. In order to mislead investigators, his abductors had pretended to demand ransom from the Chua family.

On 31 March 2004, Arnulfo Aparri, Jr., one of the four suspects in the killing of Chua, was sentenced to die by lethal injection, and was ordered to pay Php 50,000.00 to the victim's family as indemnity. His sentence was later commuted to life imprisonment without parole after the death penalty was abolished in 2006. Another of the accused, Eduardo Tabrilla, pleaded guilty to homicide and was sentenced to 6-14 years of imprisonment in 2006. The whereabouts of the two other suspects, Paul Joseph Tan and Michael Von Rainard Manangbao remain uncertain.

References

External links
Chronology of events related to the death of Mark Chua

Year of birth missing
2001 deaths
Deaths by person in the Philippines
Filipino murder victims
University of Santo Tomas alumni
People murdered in the Philippines
Filipino whistleblowers
Crime in Metro Manila
21st century in Manila
Reserve Officers' Training Corps (Philippines)
2001 murders in the Philippines